Malaisia scandens (syn. Trophis scandens), the burny vine or crow ash, is a species of large woody vines, constituting part of the fig plant family. They grow naturally in rainforests in Australia and Malesia. It is the only species in the genus Malaisia.

In Australia, they grow naturally from Mount Dromedary in coastal south–eastern New South Wales northwards through the eastern coastal regions to north Queensland, Cape York Peninsula and further across coastal regions of northern Australia in the Northern Territory and Western Australia.

Botanists have recognised and described two subspecies, as follows, one endemic to Lord Howe Island offshore from New South Wales Australia and the type subspecies of mainland Australia and Malesia.
Malaisia scandens subsp. megacarpa  – Lord Howe Island
Malaisia scandens subsp. scandens – NSW, Qld, NT, WA

References 

Flora of New South Wales
Flora of Lord Howe Island
Flora of Queensland
Rosids of Western Australia
Flora of the Northern Territory
Moraceae